Mohammed Shahid (14 April 1960 – 20 July 2016) was an Indian field hockey player. He is considered one of India's best to have played the game and was known for his dribbling skills. He was a member of the Indian team that won the gold medal at the 1980 Olympic Games in Moscow. He was awarded Arjuna Award in 1980–1981 and Padma Shri in 1986.

Career
Mohammed Shahid was born on 14 April 1960 in Varanasi, Uttar Pradesh. He made his first appearance for India in the junior team in 1979 at the Junior World Cup in France. Shahid made his first senior team appearance the same year in a four-nation tournament in Kuala Lumpur under the captaincy of Vasudevan Baskaran, after his inclusion in the team following his impressive performance in the Aga Khan Cup.

During his playing days, Shahid was known for his running ability, dribbling of the ball and push which was as fast as a hard hit. His attacking partnership on the field with Zafar Iqbal was well known."Zafar at left-out and Shahid at right-in positions penetrated the best of the defences around the world with their superb understanding and passing of the ball. Zafar also pointed that Shahid was instrumental in the V. Baskaran-led India winning the gold medal at the 1980 Olympic Games. “Shahid played a crucial role for India in that Olympics, otherwise we would have been difficulty,” Zafar, who was part of that team, pointed."He was awarded the 'Best Forward player' at the 1980 Champions Trophy in Karachi. He was a member of the team that won the gold at the 1980 Summer Olympics in Moscow, silver at the 1982 Asian Games and bronze at the 1986 Asian Games. He also played in the World Cup in Mumbai (then Bombay) in 1981–82, the Los Angeles Olympic Games in 1984 and the Seoul Games in 1988.

His skill and ability at the 1986 Seoul Asian Games earned him a place in the Asian All-Star team in 1986. He captained the Indian team during 1985–86. He announced his retirement from international hockey in January 1989.

His biggest contribution to the game of field hockey was the 'half push- half hit'- a stroke he used to hit the ball using the same grip used to dribble the ball. With the left hand on top of the handle and the right half low down around the centre of the stick he used to essay this shot with a minimum back lift and slam the ball towards his partner-teammate to make an early and accurate pass. The same stroke was adapted by his successor Dhanraj Pillay, who was an ardent fan of the maestro.

Shahid was the product of the Sports College Lucknow from where emerged a few other stars of the 1980s like Ravinder Pal Singh, his teammate at the Moscow Olympics (1980), Rajinder Singh Rawat who played in goal in the Los Angeles Olympics (1984) and many others who went on to don the national colours at the junior and senior international level. The Sports College and Hostels were the brainchild of another famous star of the 1950s Kunwar Digvijay Singh "Babu".

Later, he became a sports officer with the Indian Railways in Varanasi.

Personal life
Shahid had six brothers and three sisters (he was the youngest brother), and his father ran a small hotel in Ardali Bazar area of Varanasi. He married Parvin in 1990, and had twins (son Saif and daughter Hina) from the marriage.

Death 
In June 2016, Shahid was admitted to Medanta hospital, Gurgaon when he was suffering from a serious liver disease. He was airlifted from Varanasi to Gurgaon after ignoring a bout of jaundice. His condition continued to deteriorate with weakening liver and kidneys. He died on 20 July in Gurgaon. His funeral was held in hometown Varanasi the next day. His funeral was attended by officials, local politicians of the city and Olympians including Zafar Iqbal, Ashok Kumar, Sujit Kumar, RP Singh, Shaqil Ahmed and Sardar Singh.

Awards and recognition 
 Arjuna Award (1980–81)
 Padma Shri (1986) 
 Best player 1986 Men's Hockey World Cup

References

External links
 

1960 births
2016 deaths
Field hockey players at the 1980 Summer Olympics
Field hockey players at the 1984 Summer Olympics
Field hockey players at the 1988 Summer Olympics
Olympic field hockey players of India
Olympic gold medalists for India
Indian Muslims
Recipients of the Padma Shri in sports
Recipients of the Arjuna Award
Athletes from Varanasi
Field hockey players from Uttar Pradesh
Indian male field hockey players
Medalists at the 1980 Summer Olympics
Asian Games silver medalists for India
Asian Games bronze medalists for India
Medalists at the 1982 Asian Games
Medalists at the 1986 Asian Games
Asian Games medalists in field hockey
Field hockey players at the 1982 Asian Games
Field hockey players at the 1986 Asian Games
Olympic medalists in field hockey